Daqiao Subdistrict (Shanghainese: du3jiau1 ka1dau2) is a subdistrict of Yangpu District, Shanghai. , it has 29 residential communities under its administration.

See also
List of township-level divisions of Shanghai

References

Township-level divisions of Shanghai
Yangpu District